BF Orionis is a young Herbig Ae/Be star in the constellation of Orion about  away, within the Orion Nebula. It is the most massive star of the small birth cluster of four stars.

Properties 
BF Orionis is a Herbig Ae/Be star variable similar to UX Orionis. It is still accreting mass, producing about 2 through the release of gravitational energy, and is surrounded by a massive, optically thick protoplanetary disk of 0.005 visible nearly edge-on. The brightness of the star is strongly variable, with irregular deep minima down to 13th magnitude. The variations are suspected to be partly caused by a brown dwarf or massive planet embedded in the protoplanetary disk, together with very large comets.

Unlike typical Herbig Ae/Be stars, 90-95% of which do not have  detectable magnetic fields, BF Orionis has  a fairly strong longitudinal magnetic field of −144 gauss. It also has small (0.11 magnitude) short-period, single-mode pulsations of the Delta Scuti type.

References 

Herbig Ae/Be stars
Circumstellar disks
Orion (constellation)
J05371326-0635005
026403
Orionis, BF
Delta Scuti variables
Algol variables